Hert or De Hert is a surname. Notable people with the surname include:
Alvin Tobias Hert (1865–1921), Kentucky republican
Andriy Hert (1994), Ukrainian professional footballer
Jiří Heřt (1928–2014), Czech physician and researcher
Robbe De Hert (1942–2020), Belgian film director
Sallie Aley Hert (1863–1948), Kentucky republican
Tami Hert, American R&B singer

Dutch-language surnames